"Far Away" is a song by American rapper Tyga featuring American Idol finalist Chris Richardson. The song was first released on May 17, 2011 as the lead single from the rapper's debut studio album, Careless World: Rise of the Last King (2012). The song, which was produced by British producer Jess Jackson, debuted at number 98 on the US Billboard Hot 100 for the chart dated August 20, 2011, reaching a peak of number 86 for the chart dated October 1, 2011. The track also peaked at number 93 on the US Hot R&B/Hip-Hop Songs and number 16 on the US Hot Rap Songs. As of January 25, 2012, "Far Away" has sold approximately 303,000 copies in the US. On March 19, 2020, the single was certified gold by the Recording Industry Association of America (RIAA) for combined sales and album-equivalent units over 500,000 units in the United States.

Artwork
The cover depicts Tyga with a field and a railroad pictured in the background implying that he is travelling to the one who is described in the song as being "Far Away". Ology commented on the official artwork for the single by saying that it was reminiscent of Eminem's Recovery album cover released last year.

Background
In an interview with Artistdirect, Chris Richardson explained the concept behind the song:

"Far Away" is about the feeling of being so far away from someone you love. It portrays that  of when we mess up and we want to make amends. Your relationship means the world to you, and you'd do anything for your significant other. You'd walk a thousand miles for that person. It's that whole love connection. "Far Away" tells a story of how the guy in the relationship has done wrong, and it might be too late because his girl might be off and gone with someone else.

Critical reception
PopCrush gave the song a four out of five stars and noted that the performance by Richardson really brightened up the track with a "soulful hook". They also commented on the track by saying "The appealing melody and lyrical depth make ‘Far Away’ a definite winner." Ology negatively received the song and commented on it by saying "The thing that's killing this track is the beat, because Tyga doesn't have the voice for it. This is a record meant for someone along the lines of Lupe or XV. Probably Drake too, but none of us want to resort to that. The Chris Richardson vocals add that pop-hop element to the hook, and the guitar-happy bars pump the pop even further, and with Tyga's voice, it's a juxtaposition that clashes a bit too much for success."

Music video
The official video for "Far Away" was released on July 27, 2011 and has since gained over twenty million views on YouTube. The video is based around a story in which Tyga tries to re-unite with his girlfriend. The girl dies in a fatal car accident near the end of the video which creates a sense of separation for Tyga.

Track listing

Charts

Weekly charts

Year-end charts

Certifications

Release history

References

2011 singles
2011 songs
Tyga songs
Cash Money Records singles
Songs written by Tyga
Songs written by Chris Richardson